Sassy Sika Osei (born 1985) is a Ghanaian actress, producer and TV personality who has worked as a brand influencer for popular brands including L’Oreal Paris and Woodin. She is currently the co-host of popular TV shows and red carpet events which includes DStv's Studio 53 extra, NdaniTV's Fashion Insider, 2019 VGMA red carpet experience, Channel O News Live in Accra and Glitz Africa Fashion Week for Star Gist on DStv.

Education 
Osei was born in Ghana but due to her mother's occupation, a diplomat of the United Nations, she had to live in various countries including South Africa, USA and India. On returning to Ghana, she schooled at SOS and earned a bachelor's degree in art from the University of Ghana. She proceeded to Ghana Institute of Management and Public Administration(GIMPA) where she studied law.

Career 
Osei's work revolves around acting, producing movies and hosting shows and events. She was the first female presenter of Phamous TV, a popular lifestyle and entertainment show. As of 2017 she was the face of Habiba Shea Butter after she was name brand ambassador for Ghandour Cosmetics Limited, a Cosmetic Giant. In 2016, she co-hosted the African Fashion and Design Week in Nigeria. In 2019, she co-hosted the VGMA red carpet experience, with Giovani Caleb. Currently, she co-hosts  popular TV shows including DStv's Studio 53 extra and Fashion Insider by NdaniTV.

Personal life 
On 22 October 2021, Osei married Sele Douglas in Accra, Ghana.

Filmography 

 Grey Dawn
 3 Nights Ago
 Joseph
 In Line
 Hustle
 The Counselor
 Public Property
As producer
 Guilty
 3NA

Awards 

 2018 Golden Movie Awards – In Line won the Best Comedy award
 2019 Golden Movie Awards – Bad Luck Joe nominated Best Comedy award
Africa Movie Academy Awards 2018 – Sidechic Gang nominated for Best Actress in a Leading Role
 Lagos 30 Under 40 Award – nominated

References

Ghanaian actresses
1985 births
Living people
University of Ghana alumni
Ghana Institute of Management and Public Administration alumni
Ghanaian television producers
Ghanaian women television producers